Mothern was a Brazilian comedy television series, created by Luca Paiva Mello and Rodrigo Castilho for the GNT channel.

Plot 
Beatriz, Mariana, Raquel and Luísa are young, professionals and mothers. On the verge of a nervous breakdown, they try to find balance in their lives and the best way to raise their children.

Cast 
Camila Raffanti ... Raquel
Fernanda D'Umbra ... Mariana
Juliana Araripe ... Beatriz
Melissa Vettore ... Luísa
Alexandre Freitas  ... Zé
Otávio Martins ... Léo
Rafinha Bastos ... Marcelo
Miguel de Azevedo Marques ... Filipe 
Giovana Ramos and Giulia Ramos ... Nina 
Pedro Henrique Lemos ... Martim 
Pietra Pan ... Laura 
Enrico Damaro ... Pedro 
Klara Castanho ... Bel

Awards

References

External links
 Mothern - Minha Série
 Mothern at the IMDb

2006 Brazilian television series debuts
2007 Brazilian television series endings